Muhamed Šahinović (born 30 September 2003) is a Bosnian professional footballer who plays as a goalkeeper for Bosnian Premier League club Sarajevo and the Bosnia and Herzegovina U21 national team.

Club career

Sarajevo
Šahinović signed his first professional contract with hometown club Sarajevo in September 2022. He made his debut in a cup match against Radnički Lukavac. On 27 August 2022, he became the youngest goalkeeper to play in the Sarajevo derby against city rivals Željezničar.

Career statistics

Club

Honours
Sarajevo
Bosnian Cup: 2020–21

References

2003 births
Living people
Sportspeople from Sarajevo
Bosnia and Herzegovina footballers
Bosnia and Herzegovina youth international footballers
Bosnia and Herzegovina under-21 international footballers
Association football goalkeepers
FK Sarajevo players
Premier League of Bosnia and Herzegovina players